Chapter & Verse is a compilation album by the English rock band Magnum, released in 1993 by Polydor.

The album consisted mostly of ordinary studio versions of previously released songs. The cover art includes symbols from previous Magnum albums released by Polydor, including the unicorn from Vigilante and the sword from one of Magnum's band logos.

Track listing

Personnel
Tony Clarkin – guitar
Bob Catley – vocals
Wally Lowe – bass guitar
Mark Stanway – keyboards
Mickey Barker – drums

References

External links
 www.magnumonline.co.uk — Official Magnum site

Albums produced by Keith Olsen
Albums produced by David Richards (record producer)
Albums produced by Roger Taylor (Queen drummer)
Magnum (band) compilation albums
1993 compilation albums
Polydor Records compilation albums